The Oswegatchie Pumping Station is a pumping station on the Oswegatchie River at Ogdensburg in St. Lawrence County, New York.  It was built in 1868 of random ashlar limestone.  It is a two-story fortress like structure which features engaged tower projections at each of its four corners.

It was listed on the National Register of Historic Places in 1990.

References

Transportation buildings and structures in St. Lawrence County, New York
Water supply pumping stations on the National Register of Historic Places
Water in New York (state)
Industrial buildings and structures on the National Register of Historic Places in New York (state)
Industrial buildings completed in 1868
National Register of Historic Places in St. Lawrence County, New York
1868 establishments in New York (state)